Rabi Lamichhane (born 11 June 1975) is a Nepalese politician and a former journalist. He is a former member of the House of Representatives elected from Chitwan 2 in the 2022 general election and former Deputy Prime Minister and Minister of Home Affairs.

Broadcast career 
Lamichhane rose to fame as the host of a television show on the News24 aimed at setting the world record for the longest marathon hosting of a television show in April 2013. He selected the 'Buddha was born in Nepal' theme in order to "help promote Nepal globally". The previous record was set by two Ukrainian presenters who stayed on the air for 52 hours in 2011. He interviewed politicians, journalists, and celebrities, and took phone calls from viewers. While he set the Guinness world record at over 62 hours in April 2013, the record has since been broken by Alexandru Raducanu of Romania, who hosted an over 72-hour-long show.

Lamichhane went on to host the popular Sidha Kura Pradhanmantri Sanga (Straight Talk with the Prime minister) with Prime minister KP Sharma Oli on the Nepal Television and News 24. Later he went on to host Sidha Kura Janata Sanga (Straight Talk with the People) on News 24. The show's format has Lamichhane providing an editorial monologue alongside reporting, primarily the kind of sting journalism pioneered by the Indian news magazine Tehelka. Lamichhane follows up on complaints from ordinary people, chiefly victims of fraud or corruption, and confronts the alleged perpetrators on camera. The show has been described as "unapologetically nationalist, at times simplistic in its coverage of complex issues," and creating "a cult of personality around its host". Lamichhane resigned from News24 in January 2021 and announced the launch of a new version of his show as Sidha Kura on Galaxy 4K TV.

Legal issues 
On 15 August 2019, police arrested Lamichhane from his News 24 office in connection with the suicide of journalist Shalikram Pudasaini. In a video recorded before his death, Pudasaini, who had also worked for News24, had named Lamichhane, among others, as driving him to suicide. Chitwan police charged Lamichhane, along with two others with abetment of suicide. His arrest provoked widespread protest rallies in his support across the country with thousands of young people taking to the streets in Chitwan. Protestors saw Lamichhane's arrest as an attempt to stifle his journalism and as retaliation for his exposure of corruption in the state. Lamichhane was released on Rs 500,000 bail a few days later.

The court eventually cleared Lamichhane of all charges.

Citizenship 
Lamichhane was an American citizen from 2007 to 2017. He claimed that his previous Nepali citizenship was revived following the renouncement of his American citizenship. A ruling of the Supreme Court of Nepal on 27th January 2023 removed him from all public offices (Deputy Prime Minister and Home Minister; Party Chairman and Party Parliamentary Leader) and as a Member of Parliament for not following due process and obtaining a new Nepali citizenship after renouncing his American citizenship in 2017. He re-acquired the citizenship of Nepal by following the due process on 29th January 2023.

Political career 
On 16 June 2022, Lamichhane announced his resignation from Galaxy 4K TV in order to contest the 2022 general elections later in the year for a seat to the House of Representatives. He announced the formation of a new political party, the Rastriya Swatantra Party on 21 June 2022. He registered his candidacy from Chitwan 2. His car was vandalized while on the campaign trail in Chitwan on 13 November 2022.

Lamichhane was elected with a majority of 34,312 votes, defeating Nepali Congress' Umesh Shrestha, an incumbent minister of state, and CPN (UML)'s Krishna Bhakta Pokhrel, the incumbent member of the constituency. In the aftermath of the election, his party supported Pushpa Kamal Dahal's nomination for prime minister, and Lamichhane led the RSP in government as deputy prime minister and minister for home affairs, and was sworn in on 26 December 2022.

During his campaign for the 2022 general election, a complaint was filed calling for his candidacy to be scrapped. The complainant claimed that he had not renounced his Nepali citizenship while being an American citizen and Nepali law does not allow the provision of dual citizenship.  On 27 January 2022, the Supreme Court of Nepal ruled that Lamichhane did not follow due process to re-obtain his Nepali citizenship after renouncing his American citizenship, and thus, he was not a legal Nepali citizen. This verdict effectively stripped Lamichhane of his position as the deputy prime minister and the minister of home affairs. He re-acquired his Nepalese citizenship two days later.

On 5 February 2023, Lamichhane held a news conference alleging that the media had tried to frame him for his citizenship controversy, specifically namingKantipur Publications, Onlinekhabar, Annapurna Publication, and Setopati. Lamichhane challenged owners and editors such as Kailash Sirohiya to focus on the news and to run for office if they wanted to run a government.

Criticism 
While Lamichhane has become a celebrity in Nepal, there are some who have raised questions about his style of journalism and the "cult of personality" that has sprung up around him. While his methods have borne results for the ordinary people on whose behalf he pursues cases of fraud and corruption, critics have pointed to his "nationalist posturing" and "simplistic storylines".

Personal life 
Rabi Lamichhane was married to Isha Lamichhane for 24 years until their divorce in 2019. They had been separated for 10 years prior to their divorce. He married Nepal Film Development Board chair, Nikita Poudel on 21 January 2019. Lamichhane has two daughters with his first wife.

See also 

 Rastriya Swatantra Party

References

|-

|-

|-

|-

Living people
Nepalese journalists
1974 births
People from Kathmandu
Former United States citizens
Rastriya Swatantra Party politicians
Nepal MPs 2022–present
Nepalese political party founders
21st-century journalists